Oswaldo de Barros Velloso (25 August 1908 – 8 August 1996) was a Brazilian football player. He has played for Brazil national team at the 1930 FIFA World Cup finals.

Honours

Club
 Campeonato Baiano (1): 
Bahiano de Tênis: 1927

National
 Copa Río Branco (1): 
Brazil: 1931

References

External links
Profile at Globo Esporte's Futpedia

1908 births
1996 deaths
People from Corumbá
Brazilian footballers
Brazil international footballers
1930 FIFA World Cup players
Fluminense FC players
Association football goalkeepers
Sportspeople from Mato Grosso do Sul